Jot or JOT may refer to:

Persons with the name 
 Jot Agyeman (born 1967), Ghanaian actor
 Jot D. Carpenter (1938–2000), American landscape architect
 Jot Goar (1870–1947), American baseball player

Computing
 Jot (programming language)
 The Journal of Object Technology
 The Joy of Tech, a webcomic
 Jot, a handwriting recognition system which became the basis for Palm OS' Graffiti 2

Other uses 
 Jot, or Jat, an umbrella term for the peripatetic groups of Afghanistan
 Jot (interval), a musical pitch interval
 Jot (letter), or yot, a name for the letter J
 JOT (TV series), a syndicated, animated television series
 Jot, the Greek letter iota, in the stock phrase "not one jot or tittle"
 Joliet Regional Airport (IATA: JOT)